Frustration is an emotional response. It may also refer to:

Frustration of purpose, in contract law
Frustration Ridge, Churchill Mountains, Antarctica
Frustration Dome, Mac. Robertson Land, Antarctica
Geometrical frustration, in mathematics and physics
"Frustration", a song by Soft Cell
Frustration (solitaire), a single-player card game
Frustration!, a board game